Travelin' Light is a 1965 studio album by Shirley Horn.

Reception

The Allmusic review by Scott Yanow awarded the album four stars and said that "[T]he main star throughout is Horn. Not all of the material is equally strong and none of the very concise dozen performances clocks in at even three minutes, so this is not an essential session. But Shirley Horn fans and completists will want the generally enjoyable vocal date."

Track listing
 "Trav'lin' Light" (Johnny Mercer, Jimmy Mundy, Trummy Young) – 2:47
 "Sunday in New York" (Carroll Coates, Peter Nero) – 1:40
 "I Could Have Told You" (Carl Sigman, Jimmy Van Heusen) – 2:58
 "Big City" (Marvin L. Jenkins) – 2:00
 "I Want to Be with You" (Lee Adams, Charles Strouse) – 2:49
 "Some of My Best Friends Are the Blues" (Al Byron, Woody Harris) – 2:22
 "Someone You've Loved" (Johnny Pate) – 2:56
 "Don't Be on the Outside" (Sidney Wyche, George Kelly, Mayme Watts) – 2:48
 "You're Blasé" (Ord Hamilton, Bruce Sievier) – 2:22
 "Yes, I Know When I've Had It" (Pate) – 2:17
 "Confession" (Howard Dietz, Arthur Schwartz) – 2:26
 "And I Love Him" (John Lennon, Paul McCartney) – 2:29

Personnel
Performance
Shirley Horn – piano, vocals
Joe Newman – trumpet
Jerome Richardson – flute, tenor saxophone
Frank Wess - flute, alto and tenor saxophones
Kenny Burrell – guitar
Marshall Hawkins – bass
Bernard Sweetney – drums

Production
Johnny Pate – brass arrangements (#2,4,8,10), producer
Hollis King, Dan Serrano – art direction
Sharon Franklin – assistant
Andy Baltimore – creative director
Dave Grusin – executive producer, producer (GRP Records CD reissue)
Larry Rosen (GRP Records CD reissue)
Alba Acevedo – graphic design
James Gavin – liner notes
Chuck Stewart – photography
Joseph Doughney, Michael Landy – post-production, producer
Michael Pollard – producer, production coordination
Sonny Mediana – production director
Michael Cuscuna – reissue producer

References

1965 albums
Shirley Horn albums
Albums arranged by Johnny Pate
Albums produced by Johnny Pate
ABC Records albums